Nora Today is the studio album by Filipino singer-actress Nora Aunor released in 1972 by Alpha Records Corporation in the Philippines in LP format and later released in 2000 in a compilation/ cd format.  The album contains 12 tracks of the well-loved songs of all time, including two covers of Carpenters songs (Sing and Bless the Beasts and Children). Nora Aunor will also star in a movie also called Impossible Dream a year later.

Track listing

Side one

Side two

See also
 Nora Aunor discography

References 

Nora Aunor albums
1972 albums